Douglas Harry Bosco (born July 28, 1946) is an American lawyer, politician, and newspaper owner from California. He is a former U.S. Representative, serving in Congress as a Democrat from 1983 to 1991.

Early life 
Born in Brooklyn, New York, Mr. Bosco attended Fremont High School in Sunnyvale, California. He graduated from the Capitol Page School in Washington, D.C., 1963. He received a B.A. from Willamette University in 1968 and a J.D. from Willamette Law in 1971. He was admitted to the California bar in 1971, and commenced practice in San Rafael. He served as director of the California Department of Human Relations in 1973. He became executive director of the Marin County Housing Authority in 1974.

Political career

California State Assembly (1978-82) 
Mr. Bosco was elected to the California State Assembly, and served from 1978 to 1982.  In 1979, he wrote and passed the Renewable Resources Investment Act with then Governor Jerry Brown, which set up a state fund to protect fisheries, forests, urban forests, and the coastline.  He served as a delegate to the 1980 Democratic National Convention and as a delegate to the California State Democratic convention in 1982.

United States House of Representatives (1982-90) 
Then, in a major upset, he defeated a 20-year incumbent, Republican Don Clausen by just over two points. In Congress, Mr. Bosco, an advocate of fishery and natural resource conservation, authored the California Wilderness Act, the Smith River National Recreation Area Act. And in 1989, along with Barbara Boxer and Nancy Pelosi, Mr. Bosco co-authored the legislation to preserve the Cordell Bank National Marine Sanctuary, protecting the coast of northern California from offshore oil drilling.

Mr. Bosco went on to serve four terms in the House, but lost by only 1.5 points in 1990 to Republican Frank Riggs.

Mr. Bosco attempted a comeback to his Congressional seat in 1994, by challenging Democratic incumbent Dan Hamburg, but lost the primary of a hotly contested race between the area's three former congressmen. Hamburg went on to lose the general election to Frank Riggs, a Republican.

Post-political career 
Mr. Bosco continues to be influential in state and local politics.  Mr. Bosco serves as the chairman of the California State Coastal Conservancy, preserving public access to California's coastline.  In 2012, Mr. Bosco became a part-owner of ''The Press Democrat."

Once a resident of Occidental, California, Mr. Bosco currently resides with his family in Santa Rosa, California.

References

Sources

1946 births
Living people
Democratic Party members of the United States House of Representatives from California
Democratic Party members of the California State Assembly
People from Occidental, California
People from San Rafael, California
People from Brooklyn
Editors of California newspapers
Willamette University alumni
Willamette University College of Law alumni
Journalists from California
Journalists from New York City
People from Sunnyvale, California
People from Santa Rosa, California
20th-century American politicians